Allardina katangana is a species of beetle in the family Carabidae, the only species in the genus Allardina.

References

Lebiinae